Andropterum is a genus of African plants in the grass family. There is only one known species, Andropterum stolzii, native to Zimbabwe, Zambia, Mozambique, Tanzania, Malawi and Burundi.

See also
 List of Poaceae genera

References

Andropogoneae
Grasses of Africa
Monotypic Poaceae genera